Handcross Park School is an independent co-educational preparatory school in Handcross, between Crawley, Horsham and Haywards Heath in West Sussex, England. The school provides private co-education from the Nursery aged 2, through Pre-Prep and into Prep until aged 13, with a mix of day pupils flexi, weekly and full boarders. The school traces its origins back to 1887, and moved to its current site in 1968. The School was formed as a result of the merger of two prep schools, Newells and Desmoor. Newells had to move to this site following a fire in which one pupil died. The staff and pupils of Desmoor then moved from Ewhurst in Surrey. Originally there were two headmasters, Captain Peter Hope-Lang and Mr Alan McNeile, until Hope-Lang's death in 1970. For a time the school was also known as Newells and Desmoor School.

As of 2019, the School has 414 pupils. The Headmaster, Richard Brown, joined the school in September 2016, taking over from Graeme Owton, who became Head in 2011. Graeme Owton has become Executive Head of the Brighton College Prep Schools.

In June 2011 a merger with Brighton College was announced.

Badge
The school continues use of the badge that was in use when the school was at Newells, Lower Beeding, and before then, at Seafield Park, Lee-on-Solent. It is a device comprising an heraldic style shield of gold on a blue background, over the motto, worded in Middle English, "Be Trewe".

References

External links
Official website
Independent Schools Inspectorate - Inspection Report (2011)
Ofsted - Inspection report for early years provision (2006)
 Brighton College, Junior Boarding (11-13)
 A Brighton College School

Educational institutions established in 1887
Mid Sussex District
Preparatory schools in West Sussex
1887 establishments in England